A partial solar eclipse will occur on Friday, August 13, 2083.

Related eclipses

Solar eclipses 2080–2083

Metonic series

References

External links 

2083 in science
2083 8 13
2083 8 13